The Chinese Quarter of  Birmingham, England is located in the city centre's Southside. It is an area with a predominantly Chinese influence as a result of a concentration of Chinese owned businesses, organisations and social clubs. The area now covers a neighbourhood that includes Hurst Street, Ladywell Walk and Pershore Street.

Many of the buildings in the area have Chinese architectural features and art including Chinese style roofs and wall murals in the Arcadian Centre depicting historical scenes typical of the Silk Road.

History
The Chinese Quarter first emerged as an informal cluster of Chinese community organisations, social clubs, and businesses in the 1960s centred on Hurst Street. Its development was fueled by migrants of Chinese Heritage from Hong Kong following World War II. The Chinese Quarter was officially recognised in the 1980s. There is a large event here each year for Chinese New Year.

Landmarks

The Chinese Quarter has a prominent landmark in the form of a seven-storey granite pagoda surrounded by Chinese style gardens and sculpture. It was erected in 1998 and is situated on the outskirts of the Chinese Quarter in Holloway Circus also commonly referred to as 'Pagoda Island'.

The Pagoda was donated by the Wing Yip Group - a Chinese owned business with links with Birmingham.

Surrounding Areas
The Chinese Quarter is located between the Bullring Shopping Complex in the north, the Irish Quarter in Digbeth to the east, the Arcadian Centre and Gay Village to the south and the Theatre District to the west.

See also 
 Chinese Pagoda, Birmingham.
 Food and drink in Birmingham, England.
 Chinatowns in Europe.

Further reading

External links 
 photographs of places in the Chinese Quarter
 BirminghamUK.com's guide to the Chinese Quarter

Areas of Birmingham, West Midlands
Chinese community in the United Kingdom
Birmingham
Chinese Quarter, Birmingham
Urban quarters in England